The Securities Contracts (Regulation) Act, 1956 also known as SCRA is an Act of the Parliament of India enacted to prevent undesirable exchanges in securities and to control the working of stock exchange in India. It came into force on 20 February 1957.

See also 
 List of Acts of the Parliament of India
 Securities and Exchange Board of India Act, 1992

References 

Acts of the Parliament of India 1957